Błonie  (1943–1945 German Theodorshof) is a village in the administrative district of Gmina Łęczyca, within Łęczyca County, Łódź Voivodeship, in central Poland.

The village has a population of 550.

References

Villages in Łęczyca County